The Best Male College Basketball Player ESPY Award was presented annually between 1993 and 2001 to the male collegiate basketball player adjudged to be the best in the United States in a given calendar year.  The award was subsumed in 2002 by the Best Male College Athlete ESPY Award.

The award voting panel comprised variously fans; sportswriters and broadcasters, sports executives, and retired sportspersons, termed collectively experts; and ESPN personalities from amongst choices selected by the ESPN Select Nominating Committee.  Inasmuch as the ESPY Awards ceremonies were conducted in February during the pendency of the award's existence, an award presented in a given year is for performance and achievements in the one year theretofore.

See also
Adolph Rupp Trophy
Best Female College Basketball Player ESPY Award
Chip Hilton Player of the Year Award
John R. Wooden Award
Naismith College Player of the Year Award
Oscar Robertson Trophy

References

Awards established in 1993
Awards disestablished in 2001
ESPY Awards
College basketball trophies and awards in the United States